"MaMaSé" is the first single to be released from Flemish/Dutch girl group K3' tenth studio album MaMaSé!. It was written by Miguel Wiels,  A. Putte, P. Gillis, and produced by Studio 100. The song premiered in October 2009, on the reality television show called K2 Zoekt K3, which was the search for a new third k3 member (Kathleen Aerts had left back in March). It has charted in the Top 40 and the Ultra Top 50, and according to mid-week predictions, was already a massive success in its first week of release. The song later went platinum.

Music video

There are two versions of MaMaSé! one featuring Karen, Kristel, Josje, Noa, and Madelon and a final version that only features K2 featuring the new member Josje. There are scenes where the girls watch the TV show K2 Zoekt K3 finale and scenes where they dance with a rainbow background behind them.

Charts

Weekly charts

Year-end charts

Decade-end charts

References

 http://zappen.blog.nl/sbs-broadcasting/2009/10/03/nederlandse-josje-wint-k2-zoekt-k3
 http://videoclips.blog.nl/pop/2009/10/07/nieuwe-video-k3-ma-mase#more-2559
 http://www.freerecordshop.nl/music/mamase-5414233124368
 http://nlpop.blog.nl/hitlijsten/2009/11/07/single-top-100-k3-blijft-moeiteloos-op-1
 http://nlpop.blog.nl/tienerpop/2009/10/26/k3-scoort-platina-met-single-ma-mase
 http://nlpop.blog.nl/buitenland/2009/10/18/k3-ook-in-belgie-op-1-met-ma-mase
 http://nlpop.blog.nl/tienerpop/2009/10/04/hit-of-shit-k3-ma-mase-video

2009 singles
2009 songs